Parantica, commonly called tigers, is an Old World genus of butterflies in subfamily Danainae of family Nymphalidae. They are found in southeastern Asia, Indonesia, Papua-New Guinea, and the Philippines. Many of these species are endemic to islands and considered endangered, vulnerable, or threatened according to the IUCN Red List.
For other butterflies called tigers see the genus Danaus.

Species
Species in alphabetical order:

Parantica aglea (Stoll, 1782) – glassy (blue) tiger
Parantica agleoides (C. & R. Felder, 1860) – dark glassy tiger 
Parantica albata (Zinken, 1831) – Zinken's tiger
Parantica aspasia (Fabricius, 1787) – yellow glassy tiger
Parantica cleona (Stoll, 1782)
Parantica clinias (Grose-Smith, 1890) – New Ireland yellow tiger
Parantica crowleyi (Jenner Weir, 1894) – Crowley's tiger
Parantica dabrerai (Miller & Miller, 1978) – D'Abrera's tiger
Parantica dannatti (Talbot, 1936) – Dannatt's tiger
Parantica davidi (Schröder, 1976) – David's tiger
Parantica fuscela (Parsons, 1989)
Parantica garamantis (Godman & Salvin, 1888) – angled tiger
Parantica hypowattan (Morishita, 1981) – Morishita's tiger
Parantica kirbyi (Grose-Smith, 1894) – Kirby's tiger
Parantica kuekenthali (Pagenstecher, 1896) – Kuekenthal's yellow tiger
Parantica luzonensis (C. & R. Felder, 1863)
Parantica marcia (Joicey & Talbot, 1916) – Biak tiger
Parantica menadensis (Moore, 1883) – Manado tiger
Parantica melaneus (Cramer, 1775) – chocolate tiger 
Parantica melusine (Grose-Smith, 1894)
Parantica milagros (Schröder & Treadaway, 1880) – Milagros' tiger
Parantica nilgiriensis (Moore, 1877) – Nilgiri tiger 
Parantica pedonga (Fujioka, 1970)
Parantica philo (Grose-Smith, 1895) – Sumbawa tiger
Parantica phyle (C. & R. Felder, 1863) – Felder's tiger
Parantica pseudomelaneus (Moore, 1883) – Javan tiger
Parantica pumila (Boisduval, 1859) – least tiger
Parantica rotundata (Grose-Smith, 1890) – fat tiger
Parantica schenkii (Koch, 1865)
Parantica schoenigi (Jumalon, 1971) – Father Schoenig's chocolate
Parantica sita (Kollar, 1844) – chestnut tiger
Parantica sulewattan (Fruhstorfer, 1896) – Bonthain tiger
Parantica swinhoei (Moore, 1883) – Swinhoe's chocolate tiger
Parantica taprobana (C. & R. Felder, 1865) – Ceylon tiger
Parantica tityoides (Hagen, 1890) – Sumatran chocolate tiger
Parantica timorica (Grose-Smith, 1887) – Timor yellow tiger
Parantica toxopei (Nieuwenhuis, 1969) – Toxopeus' yellow tiger
Parantica vitrina (C. & R. Felder, 1861)
Parantica wegneri (Nieuwenhuis, 1960) – Flores tiger
Parantica weiskei (Rothschild, 1901) – Weiske's tiger

References

 
Danaini
Butterflies of Indonesia
Nymphalidae genera
Taxa named by Frederic Moore